Parliamentary elections were held in Senegal on 29 April 2001 to elect members of the National Assembly. They were the first held under the new constitution approved by a referendum earlier in the year. Following the victory of Abdoulaye Wade in the February–March 2000 presidential election, the Sopi Coalition, including Wade's Senegalese Democratic Party and its allies, won a large majority.

After Wade was elected President, he entered a situation of cohabitation with the Socialist Party, which still held an overwhelming majority of seats in the National Assembly. Wade was constitutionally barred from dissolving the National Assembly and calling a new parliamentary election, but he decided to revise the constitution and said that he would not pursue policy initiatives in the meantime. Since he was not seeking new legislation, he did not need to compromise with the National Assembly, which simply approved the budget and adjourned. The Socialist Party did not object to Wade's constitutional changes, which included giving the President the right to dissolve the National Assembly, and the new constitution easily passed a referendum in January 2001. Wade then dissolved the National Assembly and called a new parliamentary election. The Socialist-controlled upper house of Parliament, the Senate, was abolished by the referendum.

Although Wade was barred by the January 2001 Constitution from addressing rallies during the election campaign and the Sopi Coalition was not allowed to use his picture on its ballot papers, Wade actively and prominently participated in the Sopi campaign, drawing criticism from opponents. Wade urged the people to vote for the Sopi Coalition so that he could govern effectively with a secure majority.

Results

References

External links
BBC news on the election
Report from Afrol news on the election
Press reaction to the election

Elections in Senegal
Senegal
2001 in Senegal
April 2001 events in Africa
Election and referendum articles with incomplete results